Baralyme is a mixture of 80% calcium hydroxide and 20% barium hydroxide compounds that is used as an alternative to soda lime to absorb the exhaled carbon dioxide in a closed circuit anesthetic system.

The substance has been used for carbon dioxide scrubbing in diving bells and the U.S Navy's engineered SEALAB's I, II, and the failed SEALAB III.

References 

Anesthesia